Westfield Mission Valley (formerly known as Mission Valley Center and Westfield Shoppingtown Mission Valley) is a retail complex consisting of a traditional open-air shopping mall and a power center, in Mission Valley, San Diego, owned by Unibail-Rodamco-Westfield. Anchors stores include Macy's Home Furniture, Michaels, Target, Bed Bath & Beyond, and Nordstrom Rack. There is 1 vacant anchor store that was once Macy's. The power center across Mission Center Road known as Westfield Mission Valley West is anchored by big box retailers like DSW Shoes, West Elm, Old Navy, Trader Joe's and Marshalls.

History

1950s

In early 1958, May Centers proposed rezoning  in the then sparsely-populated Mission Valley area of San Diego to build a shopping mall.

1960s

By 1959, the mall was under construction, and completed in late 1960, with a grand opening on February 20, 1961. Designed by the San Diego-based architectural firm Deems-Lewis, the mall contained two large anchor spaces, occupied by Montgomery Ward, and May Company, 70 inline stores, as well as a large central courtyard. Due to its location in the floodplain of the San Diego River, the mall was designed with the stores on the level above the parking garage. Presumably, in the event of a flood, only the parking garage would be flooded, with the retail level untouched. It was San Diego's second mall, following the opening of the College Grove Center in 1960. National General Theatres Valley Circle Theater, part of the Mission Valley West strip center, opened December 23, 1966.

1970s

The mall underwent its first expansion in 1975, with the completion of a new 3-story Bullock's.

1980s

In 1983, the mall underwent a significant remodel, with a new northeast wing built, which also added a two-story Saks Fifth Avenue. This helped mitigate the effect of a Mexican economic crisis and peso devaluation, as Mexican customers, who were estimated to make up about 15% of sales, were able to obtain fewer dollars with their pesos and thus had less to spend.

1990s

In 1993, May Company rebranded as Robinsons-May as the chain merged with J.W. Robinson's. Robinson's had a location at the nearby Fashion Valley Mall that also rebranded to that new name. Westfield Group acquired the mall a year later. Along with this acquisition, another major renovation of the mall was undertaken, with a new AMC Theatres 20-screen multiplex built atop the south parking lot. The renovation project also retrofitted several new stores in existing space in the northeast wing, including Michaels, Nordstrom Rack, Loehmann's, and Bed Bath & Beyond. Additionally, a large center courtyard, originally constructed as a children's playground, was covered over to provide space for a Ruby's Diner. Around this time, Macy's acquired the Bullock's chain of department stores, which led to a rebranding of the Bullock's as a Macy's (later became a Macy's Home and Furniture store since chain replaced The Broadway a month later at the nearby Fashion Valley Mall, moving all fashion departments to that location). Borders Books & Music, Marshalls, DSW, The Good Guys, and Old Navy were added in 1995 in the adjacent power center.   

2000s

In 2001, one of the mall's original tenants, Montgomery Ward, was shuttered when the chain went bankrupt. A year later, Target opened in the former Ward's space. The Good Guys closed in 2005, and it replaced by Golfsmith a year later in the power center. In 2006, Macy's completed its acquisition of May Company, and the former Robinsons-May store was subsequently rebranded as a Macy's. In August 2008, Westfield Group filed an application for a major renovation to the Westfield Mission Valley shopping center. The project envisioned a  expansion of retail space for stores,  of commercial space, adjacent condominiums and parking. Real estate industry experts expect the project to be long-term, and development to last five to ten years. However, as of 2021 renovations proposed in 2008 have not been done to Westfield Mission Valley.

2010s

In 2012 the Seau's restaurant closed after Junior Seau's death and was replaced by a Buffalo Wild Wings in 2013. Meanwhile, at the power center Borders Books & Music closed and was converted into Giant Book Sale under a short lease until 2012. Trader Joe's and Ulta Beauty opened up in the former Borders Books & Music location in 2013. In 2014 Loehmann's, liquidated their location and was replaced by a Bloomingdale's the outlet store and Tender Greens restaurant a year later in 2015. In late 2016 the indoor food court by Macy's Home and Furniture was shuttered, and a few months after that Sport Chalet had filed for bankruptcy and closed in 2016 as well. In 2017, Golfsmith was converted into a Golf Galaxy store. In March 2017, the Macy's closed as the chain closed 68 stores across the country. The Macy's Home and Furniture store remains open at Mission Valley and a regular Macy's store remains open at nearby Fashion Valley Mall. In April 2018 Ruby's Diner, posted on their doors that they have closed their location at the center after being there for more than 20 years. In 2018, Michaels moved into the former Sport Chalet space, taking over the part that faced the north parking lot. F21 Red (Forever 21's clearance store) also opened in the sub-divied former Sport Chalet location that year removing mall access to Michaels, but closed only a year after they had opened since they announced a restructuring of the company by closing 41 stores after filing for Chapter 7 bankruptcy.

2020s

In 2019, Westfield started the redevelopment of the former Michaels Arts & Crafts store, where the building was subdivided for mainly restaurants like Havana Grill, CAVA, Pesto Italian Craft Kitchen, and Mendocino Farms. This portion was completed in late 2020 during the COVID-19 pandemic and has some geometric inspiration after the former May Company building.

Anchor stores

Architecture of the former May Company building

The original modernist May Company (later Macy's) building was designed in 1959 by William S. (Bill) Lewis, Jr. for LA-based AC Martin (later of Deems-Lewis), Frank L. Hope & Associates backstopped the project locally. It opened in 1961. It has been described by San Diego architectural photographer and historian Darren Bradley as an architectural icon, a "jewel box with a unique texture … striking architecture … the cladding all the way around the building … (is in) a modernist design that plays with light and shadow … designed to grab attention." This was part of a modernist landscape established in the area in the 1960s. As of January 2017, Westfield was considering a number of different plans for the use of the building.

A 2015 study by the City of San Diego concluded that the building meets several criteria for qualification for the San Diego Resources register: an example of community development and of an identifiable architectural style (Modern Contemporary architecture of 1955–1965). However the report stated that the building did not qualify because of the lack of integrity of the original construction, due to replacement of some original tiles, altered walls, covering up of the building by new retail space set in front of it, removal of original pop-out display windows and "May Co." signage, and demolition of the 1958 canopy and columns, thus all together the alteration of more than 50% of the surface area of the original building exterior. It also did not qualify because it is not the "identifiable work" of a "listed Master Architect".

See also

 Fashion Valley Mall
 Westfield Plaza Bonita
 Westfield Horton Plaza
 South Bay Plaza

References

External links
 

Shopping malls in San Diego County, California
Buildings and structures in San Diego
Mission Valley, San Diego
Mission Valley
Shopping malls established in 1961